Oscar Ignacio Carrasco Sotelo (born 30 June 1982 in Morelia) is a Mexican footballer who last played as a midfielder for Venados F.C. in Ascenso MX. He had previously played for a number of teams in the Mexican second tier after having played for Monarcas Morelia in Liga MX.

References

External links
 
 
 

1982 births
Living people
Sportspeople from Morelia
Footballers from Michoacán
Mexican footballers
Association football midfielders
Atlético Morelia players
Querétaro F.C. footballers
Club Tijuana footballers
Club León footballers
Correcaminos UAT footballers
Liga MX players
Ascenso MX players
Cruz Azul Hidalgo footballers
Venados F.C. players